This article states the results of the North American Soling Championships from 1969 to 1979. Unfortunately, not all crew names are documented in the major sources: United States Soling Association (USSA) bulletin "Leading Edge" and International Soling Association (ISA) magazine "Soling Sailing".

1969 Final results 

Only the results of the first 10 boats are documented.

 1969 Progress

1970 Final results 

Only the top 4 boats are documented.:

 1970 Progress
Not enouch data to generate

1971 Final results 

No detailed results are documented.

 1971 Progress
Not enouch data to generate

1972 Final results 
No documented detailed results found yet! 

  | legendlines = 
}}
 1972 Progress

1973 Final results 

Only the top 4 boats are documented.:

 1973 Progress
Not enouch data to generate

1974 Final results 

Only the results of the first 5 boats are documented:

 1974 Progress
Not enouch data to generate

1975 Final results 

Only the results of the first 10 boats are documented.

 1975 Progress

1976 Final results 

 1976 Progress
Not enouch data to generate

1977 Final results 

 1977 Progress

1978 Final results 

Only the results of the first 10 boats are documented. 

 1978 Progress

1979 Final results

Controversy
This edition of the Soling North American Championship had a long aftermath. In race 5, US 697 (Charlie Kamps), Milwaukee, was penalized with a 50% bonus as result of a protest from US 574 (Mac Dunwoody) from Houston. US 697 made several appeals, which resulted in a reinstatement of the US 697 and a penalty of 50% bonus for US 574 on 5 February 1981. This decision was made by the TYA Appeals Committee, consisting of:
 Robert W. Gough, Jr.
 Jim Anderson
 Dr. David Green

Top ten before reinstatement of Kamps (1979)

Complete results after reinstatement of Kamps (1981)

 1979 Progress

Further results
For further results see:
 Soling North American Championship results (1969–79)
 Soling North American Championship results (1980–89)
 Soling North American Championship results (1990–99)
 Soling North American Championship results (2000–09)
 Soling North American Championship results (2010–19)
 Soling North American Championship results (2020–29)

References

Soling North American Championship